Rybany is a village and municipality in Bánovce nad Bebravou District in the Trenčín Region of north-western Slovakia.

History
In historical records the village was first mentioned in 1323.

Geography
The municipality lies at an altitude of 188 metres and covers an area of 11.042 km². It has a population of about 1490 people.

Famous people
 Marián Masný, Slovak football player

References

External links

 Official page
http://www.statistics.sk/mosmis/eng/run.html

Villages and municipalities in Bánovce nad Bebravou District